Trond Vegar Magnussen (born 1 February 1973 in Fredrikstad, Norway) is a former professional Norwegian ice hockey player. His last tenure was with his hometown Stjernen in the GET-ligaen.

Trond Magnussen has played in the top leagues in three European countries, Norway, Sweden, Germany. In Norway he played for Stjernen and Lillehammer I.K. In Sweden he has represented Frölunda Indians and Färjestads BK in the Elitserien, he also played with Leksands IF in Allsvenskan. In Germany he was with both DEG Metro Stars and Duisburg in the DEL. During his time with Färjestad he won the Swedish Championship once.

He has represented Norway in eleven IIHF World Championships.

In 1995 Magnussen received the Golden Puck from the Norwegian Ice Hockey Federation.

External links

1973 births
Living people
DEG Metro Stars players
Füchse Duisburg players
Färjestad BK players
Frölunda HC players
Ice hockey players at the 1994 Winter Olympics
Leksands IF players
Lillehammer IK players
NIHF Golden Puck winners
Norwegian expatriate ice hockey people
Norwegian ice hockey right wingers
Olympic ice hockey players of Norway
Sportspeople from Fredrikstad
Stjernen Hockey players